Trondhjems Skiklub is a Norwegian sports club from Trondheim, founded in 1884. It has sections for cross-country skiing, ski jumping, and snowboarding.

World Cup ski jumper Morten Solem was a member of the club.

References
Official site 

Sports teams in Norway
Sports clubs established in 1884
Sport in Trondheim
Ski jumping clubs in Norway
1884 establishments in Norway